was a Japanese photographer.

References

Japanese photographers
1885 births
1965 deaths